David Schumacher may refer to:
David Schumacher (producer) (born 1969), American film and television producer and musician
David Schumacher (wrestler) (1931–2022), Australian wrestler
David Schumacher (racing driver) (born 2001), German racing driver